

Juodkrantė Lighthouse (Lithuanian: Juodkrantė švyturys) - a lighthouse on the Curonian Spit, on the Lithuanian coast of the Baltic Sea. The lighthouse was constructed in 1950; 900 metres away from the coastline. The lighthouse is a square pyramidal skeletal tower - with a white daymark and red gallery - making the lighthouse appear enclosed from far away.

See also

 List of lighthouses in Lithuania

References

Lighthouses completed in 1950
Resort architecture in Lithuania
Lighthouses in Lithuania
Neringa Municipality